All elections in the Czech Republic are based on the principle of universal suffrage. Any adult citizen who is at least 18 years old can vote, except those who have been stripped of their legal capacities by a court, usually on the basis of mental illness. Elected representatives are elected directly by the citizens without any intermediaries. Election laws are not part of the constitution, but – unlike regular laws – they cannot be changed without the consensus of both houses of the Parliament. The Czech Republic uses a two-round plurality voting system for the presidential and Senate elections and an open party-list proportional representation system for all other elections. The proportional representation system uses the D'Hondt method for allocating seats.

Elections are usually held over two days, from 14:00 to 22:00 on Friday and then from 8:00 to 14:00 on Saturday.

System of elections

Presidential elections

Any citizen aged 40 or over can stand for president, unless they have already served two terms in the office or have been found guilty of treason by the Constitutional Court. From 1993 to 2008, presidents were elected by both houses of the Parliament in three rounds of voting. Since the 2013 election the president is elected directly by the people in two rounds, where the top two candidates from the first round face each other again in the second round. Presidents are elected for five-year terms.

Chamber of Deputies elections

Any citizen aged 21 or over can stand as a candidate for the Chamber of Deputies, which consists of 200 members elected for four-year terms. The Chamber of Deputies elections do not necessarily take place at fixed intervals as the Chamber of Deputies can be prematurely dissolved by the president, under conditions set by the Constitution. The president also decides the date of the elections, thereby starting the official election campaign, during which political parties' spending is capped by the law.

There are 14 voting districts for elections to the Chamber of Deputies, which correspond to the regions of the Czech Republic. Each of these voting districts has a different number of seats available, and parties submit ranked lists of candidates for each district. Candidates of a political party can only win a seat if their party received at least 5% of all valid votes nationally. Voters must choose only one political party to vote for, but they may use up to four preferential votes for particular candidates of that party, which affect the final order of the candidates on the party list. After the elections, the president nominates somebody (usually the head of the winning party) to form a new Cabinet.

Senate elections

Any citizen aged 40 or over can become a senator. The Senate consists of 81 members, elected for six-year terms. Elections are held every two years, with one third of Senate seats contested each time. The country is divided into 81 senate constituencies with roughly the same number of voters. The elections consist of two rounds, in which the top two candidates from the first round face each other again in the second round. The Senate elections – and especially the second rounds – have had the lowest voter turnouts of all Czech elections.

European elections

Any citizen aged 21 or over can represent the Czech Republic as a member of the European Parliament. The Czech Republic is assigned 22 out of 736 mandates in the European Parliament. Members of the European Parliament are elected for five-year terms. There is only one constituency and one list of candidates for the entire Czech Republic. Voters must choose one political party to vote for, but can use up to two preferential votes for particular candidates of that party, which affect the final order of the candidates on the party list.

Regional elections

Any citizen aged 18 or over can become a regional councilor. There are 13 regional councils, one for each region of the Czech Republic except the capital, Prague. The City Council of Prague has a special status and acts as both regional and municipal council. Members of regional councils are elected for four-year terms. Their number varies across the regions from 45 to 65. Candidates of a political party can only win a seat if their party gained at least 5% of all valid votes. Voters must choose one political party to vote for, but they can also use up to four preferential votes  for particular candidates of that party, which affect the final order of the candidates on the party list. Voters can only vote in the region where they have registered their permanent address.

Unlike in the case of the national cabinet, there is no individual person nominated to form a new regional cabinet. Whichever coalition forms a majority in the regional council chooses the president of the regional cabinet. Political parties can switch sides, end their support for the current president of the regional council and form a new regional cabinet without the need for early elections.

Municipal elections

Any citizen aged 18 or over can become a municipal councilor. Municipal councilors are elected for four-year terms. Voters can only vote in the municipality where they have registered their permanent address. The number of councilors for each municipality varies from 5 to 55. Each voter has a number of votes corresponding to the number of seats in that particular municipal council, which can be distributed freely across candidates of all political parties.

For a party to be eligible for representation, the total number of votes for a party divided by the number of seats in the municipal council and multiplied by the number of candidates nominated by that party must exceed 5% of the total number of valid votes cast in the municipality. The number of votes for a candidate of a party in proportion to the number of all votes cast for that party affects the final order of candidates on the party list.

Referendums

The Constitution of the Czech Republic mentions referendums only in the context of "a referendum concerning the accession of the Czech Republic to the European Union". There are no other provisions concerning referendums. As such, the only state-wide referendum ever held in the Czech Republic was the Czech European Union membership referendum in 2003. The government of the Czech Republic approved a referendum bill in 2005, but it was never passed by the parliament.

Results of the latest elections

Latest presidential election

Latest Chamber of Deputies election

Latest Senate election

Overview of past elections

See also
 Electoral calendar
 Electoral system
 List of elections in the Czech Republic

References

External links
Official election website
Adam Carr's Election Archive
 NSD: European Election Database - Czech Republic publishes regional level election data; allows for comparisons of election results, 1990-2010
Czech Republic Election Data, European Journal of Political Research-Political Data Yearbook: Interactive